Shivaji II (1756 - 24 April 1813) was a Raja of Kolhapur of the Bhonsle dynasty. He ruled from 22 September 1762 to 24 April 1813. 

Maharajas of Kolhapur
1756 births
1813 deaths